Yoshiro Abelardo Salazar Flores (born 26 March 1987) is a Peruvian footballer who plays for Cienciano.

References

External links

1987 births
Living people
Association football midfielders
Peruvian footballers
Cienciano footballers
Cobresol FBC footballers
Real Garcilaso footballers